The Çekerek River (ancient Scylax) is a tributary of the Yeşil River in Turkey. Its source is near Tokat. The confluence with the Yeşil in the northeast is just to the southeast of the village of Kayabaşı.

The ancient Bronze-Age Hittite site of Maşat Höyük, not far from Zile, lies near the banks. It was occupied at least as early as the Middle Kingdom period in 1420-1340 BC, as military reports have been unearthed there.

The Çekerek, Yeşil and Delice rivers provide for a rich agriculture in the region. On the Kümbet Ova plain, the river allows the cultivation of wheat, onions, sugarbeets and other vegetables and fruit.

References

Rivers of Turkey
Geography of Amasya Province
Geography of Tokat Province